Axel F. Roque Gracía (Chino) is a Puerto Rican politician elected to the Senate of Puerto Rico on the Guayama district.

Early years and studies
Axel Roque was born on July 21, 1983 in Bayamón, Puerto Rico. Went thru the Puerto Rico public education system in Naranjito, Puerto Rico. in 2007 earned a Bachelor of Arts in Education with a concentration in history from the Interamerican University of Puerto Rico. Worked as history teacher with the Puerto Rico Department of Education.

Politics
Roque is the vice president on the New Progressive Party of Puerto Rico youth committee in Naranjito and served as a member of the city council in Naranjito from 2013 until 2016. Roque was elected as senator in the 2016 Puerto Rico general elections for the Guayama district. Presides the Youth, Recreation and sports committee.

References

1983 births
Interamerican University of Puerto Rico alumni
Members of the Senate of Puerto Rico
New Progressive Party (Puerto Rico) politicians
People from Bayamón, Puerto Rico
Living people